The Central District of Ilam County is a district (bakhsh) in Ilam County, Ilam Province, Iran. At the 2006 census, its population was 169,282, in 37,399 families.  The District has one city: Ilam.  The District has two rural districts (dehestan): Deh Pain Rural District and Keshvari Rural District.

References 

Districts of Ilam Province
Ilam County